JS Sawayuki (DD-125) is a  of the Japan Maritime Self-Defense Force (JMSDF).

The ship was built by IHI Maritime in Tokyo and commissioned into service on 15 Feb 1984.

Service
This ship was one of several in the JMSDF fleet participating in disaster relief after the 2011 Tōhoku earthquake and tsunami.

Notes

Hatsuyuki-class destroyers
1982 ships
Ships built by IHI Corporation